The Pinhook River is a river located in the St. Marks National Wildlife Refuge in Jefferson County, Florida. It drains into Apalachee Bay.

References

Rivers of Jefferson County, Florida